Don Keith Opper (born June 12, 1949) is an American actor, writer, and producer who has starred in film and on television. He is best known for his role as Charlie McFadden in the 1986 science fiction film Critters and each of the three sequels. His most recent film role is in Albert Pyun's 2005 horror film Infection. Opper has made guest appearances on many TV shows, including Miami Vice, Quantum Leap, 21 Jump Street, Roseanne, Harsh Realm and The Division.

Early life 
Opper is the son of a Chicago salesman. He worked as a clown, puppeteer, bookstore employee, studio grip and unrecognized writer before he did carpentry at Roger Corman's shop and found the chance to make Android. He has two daughters.

Filmography

References

External links

1949 births
Living people
Male actors from Chicago
American male film actors
American male television actors
Film producers from Illinois